In Russian, the term spelling rule is used to describe a number of rules relating to the spelling of words in the language that would appear in most cases to deviate from a strictly phonetic transcription.

All the spelling rules found in the Russian language dictate that certain consonants cannot be followed either under any circumstance or in an unstressed syllable by certain vowels. In most cases where spelling rules exist, they do not actually affect the pronunciation. This is a result of the fact that five of the eight Russian consonants for which spelling rules of one sort or another apply can only be either "hard" or "soft" and cannot be both. Only with the three velar consonants, which like most Russian consonants have both a hard and a soft form, does the spelling rule actually reflect phonetically based pronunciation.

Spelling rules are of major importance in the study of Russian morphology. They have a very considerable effect on the declension of nouns and adjectives and the conjugation of verbs because many of the endings produce consonant-vowel combinations that the spelling rules strictly forbid. In some cases where stress dictates whether or not a spelling rule is to be applied, "mixed declensions" can result. Russian grammar goes so far as to dictate that the spelling rules must take precedence over any other rule.

Basic Russian Spelling Rules
 Spelling Rule #1
 After the velar consonants г, к, and х:
 and the sibilant consonants ж, ч, ш, щ:
 one must never write the "hard" vowel ы, but must always replace it with its "soft" equivalent и, even though after ж and ш, и is pronounced as if it were written ы.
 Spelling Rule #2
 After the velar consonants г, к, and х:
 the sibilant consonants ж, ч, ш, щ
 and the hard consonant ц:
 one must never write the "soft" vowel ю, but must always replace it with its "hard" equivalent у, even though after ч and щ, у is pronounced as if it were written ю.
 one must never write the "soft" vowel я, but must always replace it with its "hard" equivalent а, even though after ч and щ, а is pronounced as if it were written я.
 Spelling Rule #3
 After the sibilant consonants ж, ч, ш, щ and the hard consonant ц:
 one must never write the letter о unless the syllable in which the о is to be added in the suffix is stressed.
 if the syllable in which the о is to be added in the suffix is unstressed, then one must always write е.
 This spelling rule does not have a great deal of effect on actual Russian pronunciation, because when unstressed, the vowels о and е are weakened to a very weak sound like the schwa.
 Note that this rule relates to the fact that stressed о after ж, ц, ч, ш and щ is pronounced the same as the always-stressed letter ё after the same letters. In most words, ё is preferred over stressed о after ж, ц, ч, ш and щ. When stress changes, ё invariably loses its accent.

 Spelling Rule #4
 If any of the vowels, ь, й or я is at the end of a word, it is dropped in order to add another suffix. This is the case with many feminine and masculine (those ending in й) nouns in Russian:
 One must always replace the ь, й or я with и and never with ы, even though after ж, ш, and ц, и is pronounced as if it were written ы and other suffixes for nouns allow ы after the always-hard consonant ц.

External links
 Spelling rules

See also
 Russian orthography

Russian language